The Nauru Soccer Federation is the governing body of soccer on Nauru. Nauru is not a member of the Oceania Football Confederation (OFC) and is one of the few sovereign states that is not a member of FIFA. As of July 2020 the vice-president of the association is Kaz Cain.

History 
The Nauru Soccer Federation has reportedly applied for membership in both the Oceania Football Confederation (OFC) and FIFA but was denied, presumably because of a lack of infrastructure and league system. 

In 2009 the Nauruan Minister of Sport Rayong Itsimaera indicated that the island nation desired to become a member of FIFA and the OFC wanted to accept them as a member but there were challenges preventing them from joining both bodies.   

When the OFC met in 2011 to discuss and plan the 2013 Pacific Youth and Sports Conference, the Nauru delegation attended along with representatives from thirteen other Pacific football associations.

In a December 2014 issue of The Blizzard-The Football Quarterly it was reported that the association existed and the then-president indicated that a Nauruan team practised on the island's golf course.

When Vanuatan Lambert Maltock was elected president of the OFC in 2019, the confederation indicated that funds were available to Nauru once the association has firm plans for developing the sport on the island.

As of 2020, the association is being restructured and beginning to organise soccer tournaments and other development activities on the island once again. In March 2021 it was announced that the Government of Australia was financing a number of sports programs in Nauru, including the OFC's Just Play Programme.

In July 2020 Vice-President Kaz Cain indicated that Nauru was considering creating its first-ever national side for a 2021 tournament in Hawaii.

References 

 
Association football governing bodies